Camillo De Lellis (born 11 June 1976) is an Italian mathematician who is active in the fields of calculus of variations, hyperbolic systems of conservation laws, geometric measure theory and fluid dynamics. He is a permanent faculty member in the School of Mathematics at the Institute for Advanced Study. He is also one of the two managing editors of Inventiones Mathematicae.

Biography
Prior joining the faculty of the Institute for Advanced Study, De Lellis was a professor of mathematics at the University of Zurich from 2004 to 2018. Before this, he was a postdoctoral researcher at ETH Zurich and at the Max Planck Institute for Mathematics in the Sciences. He received his PhD in mathematics from the Scuola Normale Superiore at Pisa, under the guidance of Luigi Ambrosio in 2002.

Scientific activity
De Lellis has given a number of remarkable contributions in different fields related to partial differential equations. In geometric measure theory he has been interested in the study of regularity and singularities of minimising hypersurfaces, pursuing a program aimed at disclosing new aspects of the theory started by Almgren in his "Big regularity paper".
There Almgren proved his famous regularity theorem asserting that the singular set of an m-dimensional mass-minimizing surface has dimension at most m − 2. De Lellis has also worked on various aspects of the theory of hyperbolic systems of conservation laws and of incompressible fluid dynamics. In particular, together with László Székelyhidi Jr., he has introduced the use of convex integration methods and differential inclusions to analyse non-uniqueness issues for weak solutions to the Euler equation.

Recognition

De Lellis has been awarded the Stampacchia Medal in 2009, the Fermat Prize in 2013 and the Caccioppoli Prize in 2014. He has been invited speaker at the International Congress of Mathematicians in 2010 and plenary speaker at the European Congress of Mathematics in 2012. In 2012 he has also been awarded a European Research Council grant. In 2020 he has been awarded the Bôcher Memorial Prize. In 2021 he became a member of the German Academy of Sciences Leopoldina. He has also been included in the list of invited plenary speakers of the 2022 International Congress of Mathematicians, in Saint Petersburg. In 2022 he was awarded the Maryam Mirzakhani Prize in Mathematics from the NAS.

References

External links
Site at the University of Zurich
Site of the European Congress of Mathematics in 2012
Site of the European Research Council

1976 births
Living people
21st-century Italian mathematicians
Variational analysts
European Research Council grantees
Academic staff of the University of Zurich
Institute for Advanced Study faculty
Members of the German Academy of Sciences Leopoldina